Trey may refer to:

Places
 Trey, Switzerland, a commune in Vaud, Switzerland
 Trey Peaks, Coats Land, Antarctica

Other uses
 Trey (playing card), the Three in card games
 Trey (given name)
 Trey, slang for a three-point shot in basketball
 Student Union of Tampere University (TREY), in Finland

See also
 Trea (disambiguation)
 Trae, a list of people with the given name or nickname
 Tre (disambiguation)
 Tray (disambiguation)